Lawrence Frederick Kert (December 5, 1930 – June 5, 1991) was an American actor, singer, and dancer. He is best known for his role of Tony in the original Broadway production of the musical West Side Story.

Early life

Kert was born in Los Angeles, the youngest of four children of Orthodox Jewish parents, Harry and Lillian (née Pearson; originally Peretz) Kert (some sources cite the family surname as Kurt). Kert's eldest sibling, Anita, became a vocalist, noted for dubbing Rita Hayworth and other non-singing stars in their films. He and his siblings graduated from Hollywood High School. A Shubert Theater Playbill for 1963's I Can Get It For You Wholesale, starring Kert states: "He attended Los Angeles City College. As a teenager he worked at breaking wild horses to saddle—which led to a teen-age career as a stunt man, stand-in, and extra in well-nigh 100 films".

Kert's first professional credit was as a member of a theatrical troupe called the "Bill Norvas and the Upstarts" in the 1950 Broadway revue Tickets, Please!. After a seven-month run, he worked sporadically in Broadway, Off-Broadway and ballet productions as a dancer until 1957, when he was cast in West Side Story.

West Side Story

In 1955, while dancing in the chorus in the Sammy Davis, Jr. show Mr. Wonderful, Kert was recommended by his fellow dancer and friend Chita Rivera, who eventually won the role of Anita in West Side Story, to audition as a dancer for Gangway during the earliest Broadway pre-production of the Arthur Laurents-Leonard Bernstein-Stephen Sondheim musical later titled West Side Story, an adaptation of Romeo and Juliet set on the west side of mid-town Manhattan in the 1950s. Kert was the 18th out of 150 hopefuls to audition, but was the first one to be cut. A few months later, while he was working for Esquire in an advertising show, Stephen Sondheim approached him after seeing him perform and set up an audition for the part of Tony. Kert was reluctant to accept the offer, but a few weeks later, he was informed that he had the role.

According to Arthur Laurents, who wrote the book for West Side Story, Kert was "a California extrovert, laughing, bubbling, deadly funny, and openly gay." Director-choreographer Jerome Robbins frequently clashed with Kert, publicly chastising him for being a "faggot", despite the fact that Robbins himself, fellow dancer Tommy Abbott, and most of the creative team were gay. Kert did not repeat his role in the 1961 film version of the show because at 30 years old he could not have believably played a teenager. The role went to former child actor Richard Beymer, whose vocals were dubbed by Jimmy Bryant. Kert was upset at being passed over for the role, because he had hoped that it would jump-start his film career.

Success and struggles
Kert's later career had only occasional high points. A Family Affair limped along for three months in early 1962. He was a member of the cast of the infamous ill-fated musical version of Truman Capote's novella, Breakfast at Tiffany's, which closed during previews in December 1966. His next project, La Strada (1969), starring Bernadette Peters, closed on opening night. He often worked in Off-Broadway, theatre workshops, and taught dance. However, replacing the original actor who fell ill, he played the male lead Cliff in the first run of Cabaret for most of its run. 

His next big break came as a replacement for Dean Jones as the lead in Stephen Sondheim's Company (1970). Soon after opening night, director Harold Prince released Jones from his contract and substituted Kert. The Tony Awards nominating committee allowed him to compete in the category of Best Actor in a Musical, though the rules normally restricted nominations to the performer who originated a role. The original cast album of Company had already been recorded before Kert joined the first cast. When the cast traveled to London to reprise their roles, Columbia Records recorded new tracks with Kert to substitute for those Jones had recorded. This recording with Kert was released as the Original London Cast recording. In 1998, when Sony Music, which had acquired the Columbia catalog, released a new digital version of the original Broadway cast recording, Kert's rendition of "Being Alive", the show's final number, was included as a bonus track.

In 1977, he won the role of Liza Minnelli's leading man in "Happy Endings", a movie within the movie New York, New York. Kert hoped that his role as the producer, though small, would be his great movie breakthrough. But before New York, New York opened, United Artists, the distributor, insisted that it was too long and persuaded director Martin Scorsese to drop most of the 11-minute "Happy Endings" sequence from the final version, including all of Kert's scenes. In 1981, New York, New York was re-released with "Happy Endings" intact and Kert's role restored.

In 1975, he appeared in A Musical Jubilee, a revue that lasted barely three months. Rags (1986) closed two days after it opened. In his final show, Legs Diamond (1988), he was a standby for star Peter Allen. One of Kert's last recordings was the 1987 2-CD studio cast album of the complete scores of two George and Ira Gershwin musicals: Of Thee I Sing and its sequel Let 'Em Eat Cake. This was the first time these scores had been recorded in their entirety.

Kert made brief appearances in the feature films Gentlemen Prefer Blondes (1953) and New York, New York (1977). His television credits included guest appearances on The Sorcerer's Apprentice (Alfred Hitchcock Presents), Kraft Suspense Theatre, The Bell Telephone Hour, Combat! (Season 4 episode “One At A Time”, aired 1966), Hawaii Five-O, Kojak: Conspiracy of Fear (1973), and Love, American Style. He also appeared several times on The Tonight Show Starring Johnny Carson.

Death
Kert's last stage appearance came in a touring company of La Cage aux Folles but he missed performances because of illness. Kert died, at 60, in his Manhattan home from complications of AIDS in 1991. Kert's longtime partner at the time of his death was Ron Pullen.

Stage credits

Tickets, Please! (1950) 
John Murray Anderson's Almanac (1953) 
Ziegfeld Follies of 1956 (1956) 
Mr. Wonderful (1956) 
West Side Story (1957; 1960) 
A Family Affair (1962) 
Breakfast at Tiffany's (1966) (closed before Broadway opening)
Cabaret (1968) 
La Strada (1969) 
Lock Up Your Daughters (1969)
Company (1970; 1972) (replacement for Dean Jones) 
Two Gentlemen of Verona (1973) 
Sondheim: A Musical Tribute (1973)
Sugar (1974)
All American (1975)
Mexican Hayride (1975)
A Musical Jubilee (1975) 
Side by Side by Sondheim (1977; 1978; 1985) 
Joley (1979) (closed on the road)
Al Jolson Tonight (1980; closed before Broadway opening)
They Say It's Wonderful: A Salute to Irving Berlin (1981)
Anything Goes (1982)
Barnum (1983)
They're Playing Our Song (1983)
Funny Girl (1984)
Guys and Dolls (1984)
Rags (1986)
The Rise of David Levinsky (1987)
Let 'Em Eat Cake (1987)
Of Thee I Sing (1987)
La Cage aux Folles (1987)
Legs Diamond (1988)
Nymph Errant (1989)

Sources

External links

Larry Kert at glbtq.com
Larry Kert Sings Leonard Bernstein album information at Discogs.

1930 births
1991 deaths
Male actors from California
AIDS-related deaths in New York (state)
American male musical theatre actors
American male dancers
American gay actors
Jewish American male actors
LGBT Jews
American LGBT musicians
LGBT people from California
20th-century American male actors
20th-century American singers
20th-century American dancers
20th-century American male singers
20th-century American Jews
20th-century American LGBT people